Savva Novikov (born 27 July 1999) is a Russian cyclist, who currently rides for UCI ProTeam .

Major results
2018
 2nd Team pursuit, National Track Championships
2019
 1st  Overall Tour of Iran (Azerbaijan)
1st  Young rider classification
1st Stage 3
 2nd Overall Tour of Romania
1st Stage 4
 3rd Points race, UEC European Under-23 Track Championships
 3rd Gran Premio Industria e Commercio Artigianato Carnaghese
2020
 2nd Grand Prix World's Best High Altitude
 5th Overall Tour of Mevlana
 5th Grand Prix Mount Erciyes 2200 mt
 7th Road race, National Road Championships
 9th Grand Prix Velo Erciyes
 9th Grand Prix Central Anatolia
2021
 3rd Overall Istrian Spring Trophy

References

External links

1999 births
Living people
Russian male cyclists
Russian track cyclists